This is a list of notable people from the Comoros.

Jimmy Abdou, professional footballer currently playing for Millwall F.C & the Comoros national football team
Kassim Ahamada, professional footballer
Azali Assoumani, former President of Comoros
Lubaina Himid, painter and academic
Nawal, singer-songwriter, musician
Youssouf M'Changama, professional footballer currently playing for En Avant Guingamp
Rohff, French rapper born In the Union of the Comoros, who lives in Vitry-sur-Seine
Chamsia Sagaf, singer in Swahili
Ahmed Abdallah Sambi, President of Comoros
El Fardou Ben, professional football player
Ayouba Iliassa, professional seaman deck officer

See also
List of Comorian politicians

 
Comoros-related lists
Comorians
Comorians